Jordan Stuart Ellenberg (born October 30, 1971) is an American mathematician who is a professor of mathematics at the University of Wisconsin–Madison. His research involves arithmetic geometry. He is also an author of both fiction and non-fiction writing.

Early life 
Ellenberg was born in Potomac, Maryland. He was a child prodigy who taught himself to read at the age of two by watching Sesame Street. His mother discovered his ability one day while she was driving on the Capital Beltway when her toddler informed her: "The sign says 'Bethesda is to the right.'" In second grade, he helped his teenage babysitter with her math homework. By fourth grade, he was participating in high school competitions (such as the American Regions Mathematics League) as a member of the Montgomery County math team. And by eighth grade, he had started college-level work.

He was part of the Johns Hopkins University Study of Mathematically Precocious Youth longitudinal cohort. He scored a perfect 800 on the math portion and a 680 on the verbal portion of the SAT-I exam at the age of 12. When he was in eighth grade, he took honors calculus classes at the University of Maryland; when he was a junior at Winston Churchill High School, he earned a perfect score of 1600 on the SAT; and as a high school senior, he placed second in the national Westinghouse Science Talent Search. He participated in the International Mathematical Olympiads three times, winning gold medals in 1987 and 1989 (with perfect scores) and a silver medal in 1988. He was also a two-time Putnam fellow (1990 and 1992) while at Harvard.

Career 

In 2004, he began teaching at the University of Wisconsin-Madison and is currently the John D. MacArthur Professor of Mathematics, a position he has held since 2015.  In 2012 he became a fellow of the American Mathematical Society and was a plenary speaker at the 2013 Joint Mathematics Meetings where he spoke on the subject of number theory and algebraic topology, the study of abstract high-dimensional shapes and the relations between them. He was named a Guggenheim Fellow in 2015. He was elected as one of the six A.D. White Professors-at-Large at Cornell in 2019  His research focuses on "the fields of number theory and algebraic geometry."

In addition to his research articles, he has authored a novel, The Grasshopper King, which was a finalist for the 2004 Young Lions Fiction Award; the "Do the Math" column in Slate; two non-fiction books, How Not to Be Wrong; and Shape: The Hidden Geometry of Information, Biology, Strategy, Democracy, and Everything Else (2022), as well as articles on mathematical topics in many newspapers and general magazines. 

Ellenberg was a mathematics consultant for the 2017 film Gifted, which features a math prodigy as its protagonist; he also made a cameo appearance in the film as a professor lecturing on the partition function and Ramanujan's congruences. This gives him a Erdős-Bacon number of 5.

Personal life 

Ellenberg lives in Madison, Wisconsin, with his wife and children. He maintains a blog called Quomodocumque which means "after whatever fashion" in Latin.

Works

Nonfiction 
 How Not to Be Wrong: The Power of Mathematical Thinking (Penguin, 2014) 
  Shape: The Hidden Geometry of Information, Biology, Strategy, Democracy, and Everything Else. Description and Kirkus book review. (Penguin, 2021)

Novels 
 The Grasshopper King (Coffee House Press, 2003)

Essays 
 
 
 
 
   Ellenberg's essay is adapted from his 2021 book, Shape: The Hidden Geometry of Information, Biology, Strategy, Democracy, and Everything Else, Penguin.

Filmography

References

External links 
 Personal website: writings & blog
 Interview: Jordan Ellenberg discusses mathematical misunderstandings and his book "How Not to Be Wrong" on the 7th Avenue Project radio show
 
 

1971 births
20th-century American mathematicians
21st-century American mathematicians
American writers
Arithmetic geometers
Number theorists
Fellows of the American Mathematical Society
Harvard University alumni
International Mathematical Olympiad participants
Living people
Mathematics popularizers
University of Wisconsin–Madison faculty
Writers from Wisconsin
Putnam Fellows